Oregon Trail Historic District may refer to:

Oregon Trail Historic District (American Falls, Idaho), listed on the National Register of Historic Places in Power County, Idaho
Oregon Trail Historic District (Vale, Oregon), listed on the National Register of Historic Places in Malheur County, Oregon

See also
Oregon Trail (Ada County, Idaho segment), near Boise, Idaho, listed on the NRHP in Ada County, Idaho
Vermillion Creek Crossing, Oregon Trail, Belvue, Kansas, listed on the NRHP in Pottawatomie County, Kansas
Oregon Trail, Wells Springs Segment, Boardman, Oregon, listed on the NRHP in Morrow County, Oregon
Oregon Trail, Barlow Road Segment, near Wemme, Oregon, listed on the NRHP in Clackamas County, Oregon
Oregon Trail Ruts (Guernsey, Wyoming), a National Historic Landmark and NRHP-listed in Platte County, Wyoming